Halcurias is a genus of cnidarians belonging to the family Halcuriidae.

The genus has almost cosmopolitan distribution.

Species:

Halcurias capensis 
Halcurias carlgreni 
Halcurias endocoelactis 
Halcurias macmurrichi
Halcurias mcmurrichi 
Halcurias minimus 
Halcurias pilatus 
Halcurias sudanensis

References

Actinernoidea
Hexacorallia genera